Gandhi Faiz-E-Aam (Post Graduate) College, Shahjahanpur is a Multi-streamed college in India.
This College was established in 1947 by Maulana Fazl-Ur-Rahman Khan. Normally it is famous by its abbreviation G. F. College. It is post graduate college and affiliated to Mahatma Jyotiba Phule Rohilkhand University, Bareilly. It was started with the object of imparting modern education to the students in a manner that conserves their religion, language, script and culture. The college is owned and managed by "Muslim Educational Society, Shahjahanpur", a charitable religious society

This institution is situated in Shahjahanpur a district of Uttar Pradesh in the Bareilly division. It is equipped with laboratories, lecture rooms, central library, wooden badminton courts, auditorium, cultural and heritage research centre and extensive playgrounds for football, hockey, cricket with athletics, and a computer lab.

Faculties

Faculty of Arts
Faculty of Arts comprises following departments
Department of Arabic
Department of English
Department of Hindi
Department of Persian
Department of Urdu
Department of Drawing & Painting
Department of Economics
Department of Education
Department of History
Department of Geography
Department of Philosophy
Department of Psychology
Department of Sociology
Department of Journalism & Mass Communication
Department of Social Work
Department of Library & Information Science.

Faculty of Science
Department of Botany
Department of Chemistry
Department of Mathematics
Department of Statistics
Department of Zoology
Department of Bio-Technology & Microbiology
Department of Physics

Faculty of Commerce
Department of Commerce
Department of Business Administration

Faculty of Education
Department of Education
Department of B.Ed.
Department of M.Ed.
Department of D.El.Ed (B.T.C)

Faculty of IT
Department of Computer Science

References

  http://www.gfcollege.in 

Educational institutions established in 1947
Colleges in Uttar Pradesh
1947 establishments in India
Education in Shahjahanpur